Spencer Johnson (born December 12, 1981) is a former American football defensive tackle. He was originally signed by the Minnesota Vikings as an undrafted free agent in 2004. He played college football at Auburn.

Early years 
Johnson attended Southern Choctaw High School in Silas, Alabama.  He was a letterman in both football and basketball. In football, he led his teams to the Alabama Class 2A State Championship in 1998 and 1999. In basketball, he was an All-State Honorable Mention selection. Spencer Johnson graduated from Southern Choctaw High School in 2000.

Professional career

Minnesota Vikings 
Johnson went undrafted in 2004, but subsequently signed with the Minnesota Vikings. He worked himself into the starting rotation by the seventh game of his rookie season and remained the starting defensive tackle until a knee injury ended his 2006 season on December 19.

Buffalo Bills 
He signed with the Buffalo Bills as a free agent on March 1, 2008.

NFL statistics

Key
 GP: games played
 COMB: combined tackles
 TOTAL: total tackles
 AST: assisted tackles
 SACK: sacks
 FF: forced fumbles
 FR: fumble recoveries
 FR YDS: fumble return yards 
 INT: interceptions
 IR YDS: interception return yards
 AVG IR: average interception return
 LNG: longest interception return
 TD: interceptions returned for touchdown
 PD: passes defensed

References

External links 

Buffalo Bills bio page

1981 births
Living people
People from Waynesboro, Mississippi
American football defensive tackles
Auburn Tigers football players
Minnesota Vikings players
Buffalo Bills players